Savitribai Phule was a teacher, Indian social reformer, educationalist, and poet from Maharashtra. Along with her husband, Jyotiba Phule in Maharashtra, she played a vital role in improving women's rights in India. She is considered to be the pioneer of India's feminist movement.  Savitribai and Jyotiba together founded one of the early modern Indian girls' school in Pune, at Bhidewada in 1848. She strived to abolish discrimination and unfair treatment of people on the basis of caste and gender. 

However, In the 19th century, Christian missionaries founded some school for girls in India such as Robert May of the London Missionary Society, who was the first person to open a school exclusively for girls in the region of Chinsurah, Bengal, in 1818. American Christian missionaries established some schools in Bombay, Ahemadnagar. The latter girl's schools inspired Jyotiba Phule to establish a girl's school in Poona.  

She attended the Normal school in Poona and American christian missionary Cynthia Farrar's school in Ahmednagar where she attended the course for teachers training.

Early life 
Savitribai Phule was born on 3 January 1831 at the village of Naigaon in Satara District, Maharashtra. Savitribai Phule was the youngest daughter of Lakshmi and Khandoji Nevase Patil, both of whom belonged to the Mali Community. She had three siblings. Savitribai got married to her husband Jyotirao Phule at the age of 9 or 10 (he was 13). Though they had no children of their own. It is said that they adopted Yashawantrao, a son born to a Brahmin widow. However, there is no original evidence available yet to support this. It is said that Yashwant was unable to get married because he was born to a widow, and community beliefs disallowed marriage of “such people”. Hence Savitribai arranged his marriage to her organization worker Dynoba Sasane's daughter in February of 1889.

Education 
Savitribai was illiterate at the time of her marriage. Jyotirao educated Savitribai and Sagunabai Shirsagar, his cousin sister at their home along with working at their farm.  After completing her primary education with Jyotirao, her further education was the responsibility of his friends, Sakharam Yeshwant Paranjpe and Keshav Shivram Bhavalkar. She also enrolled herself in two teacher's training programs; the first was at institution run by an American missionary, Cynthia Farrar, in Ahmednagar, and the second course was at a Normal School in Poona (Now Pune). Given her training, Savitribai may have been the first Indian woman teacher and headmistress.

Career 
After completing her teacher's education, Savitribai Phule started teaching girls at in Poona. She did so alongside Sagunabai Kshirsagar, sister of Jyotiba Phule who was a revolutionary feminist as well as a mentor to Jyotirao. Not long after beginning to teach with Sagunabai, Savitribai and Jyotirao Phule along with Sagunabai started their own school at Bhide-wada. Bhidewada was the home of Tatya Saheb Bhide, who was inspired by the work that the trio was doing. The curriculum at Bhidewada included traditional western curriculum of mathematics, science, and social studies. 

By the end of 1851, Savitribai and Jyotirao Phule were running three different schools for girls in Pune. Combined, the three schools had approximately one hundred and fifty students enrolled. Like the curriculum, the teaching methods employed by the three schools differed from those used in government schools. The author Divya Kandukuri believes that the Phule methods were regarded as being superior to those used by government schools. As a result of this reputation, the number of girls receiving their education at the Phule's schools outnumbered the number of boys enrolled in government schools.

Unfortunately, Savitribai and Jyotirao Phule's success came with much resistance from the local community with conservative views. Kandukuri states that Savitribai often travelled to her school carrying an extra sari because she would be assailed by her conservative opposition with stones, dung, and verbal abuse.  Savitribai and Jyotirao Phule were living at Jyotirao's father's home.  However, in 1839, Jyotirao's father asked him abandon this work or leave his home because orthodox people arround him threatened to boycott him from the community or by author Divya Kandukari  and its derived Brahmanical texts.

After moving out of Jyotirao's father's home, the Phule's moved in with the family of one of Jyotirao's friends, Usman Sheikh. It was there that Savitribai met a soon to be close friend and colleague named Fatima Begum Sheikh. According to Nasreen Sayyed, a leading scholar on Sheikh, "Fatima Sheikh knew how to read and write already, her brother Usman who was a friend of Jyotiba, had encouraged Fatima to take up the teacher training course. She went along with Savitribai to the Normal School and they both graduated together. She was the first Muslim woman teacher of India". Fatima and Savitribai opened a school in Sheikh's home in 1849.

In the 1850s, Savitribai and Jyotirao Phule established two educational trusts. They were entitled: the Native Male School, Pune and the Society for Promoting the Education of Mahars, Mangs, and Etceteras.  These two trusts ended up encompassing many schools which were led by Savitribai Phule and later, Fatima Sheikh.

Jyotirao summarises Savitribai and his work in an interview given to the Christian missionary periodical, Dnyanodaya, on 15 September 1853, saying, 

Together with her husband, she taught children from different castes and had opened a total of 18 schools. The couple also opened a care centre called Balhatya Pratibandhak Griha for pregnant rape victims and helped deliver and save their children.

Personal life
Savitribai and Jyotirao had no children of their own. It is said that they adopted Yashawantrao, a son born to a Brahmin widow. However, there is no original evidence available yet to support this. It is said when Yashwant was about to get married, no one was willing to give him a girl because he was born to a widow. Hence Savitribai arranged his marriage to her organization's worker Dynoba Sasane's daughter in February 1889.

Death 
Savitribai and her adopted son, Yashwant, opened a clinic to treat those affected by the worldwide Third Pandemic of the bubonic plague when it appeared in the area around Nalasopara in 1897. The clinic was established at stern outskirts of Pune, in an area free of infection. Savitribai died a heroic death trying to save the son of Pandurang Babaji Gaekwad. Upon learning that Gaekwad's son had contracted the Plague in the Mahar settlement outside of Mundhwa, Savitribai Phule rushed to his side and carried him on her back to the hospital. In the process, Savitribai Phule caught the Plague and died at 9:00pm on 10 March 1897.

Poetry and other work 
Savitribai Phule was also an author and poet. She published Kavya Phule in 1854 and Bavan Kashi Subodh Ratnakar in 1892, and also a poem entitled "Go, Get Education" in which she encouraged those who are oppressed to free themselves by obtaining an education. As a result of her experience and work, she became an ardent feminist. She established the Mahila Seva Mandal to raise awareness for issues concerning women's rights. She also called for a gathering place for women that was free of caste discrimination or differentiation of any kind. Symbolic of this was that all the women that attended were to sit on the same mat. She was also an anti-infanticide activist. She opened a women's shelter called the Home for the Prevention of Infanticide, where Brahmin widows could safely deliver their children and leave them there to be adopted if they so desired. She also campaigned against child marriage and was an advocate of widow remarriage. Savitribai and Jyotirao strongly opposed Sati Pratha, and they started a home for widows and forlorn children.

In a letter to her husband Jyotirao, Savitribai told the story about a boy about to be lynched by his fellow villagers for having relations with a woman of lower caste when Savitribai intervened. She wrote, "I came to know about their murderous plan. I rushed to the spot and scared them away, pointing out the grave consequences of killing the lovers under the British law. They changed their mind after listening to me".

Legacy 

Savitribai Phule's legacy lives on today, her work for Girl's- women's education are hugely respected.
Along with B. R. Ambedkar and Annabhau Sathe, Phule has become an icon in particular for the backward classes. Women in local branches of the Manavi Hakk Abhiyan (Human Rights Campaign, a Mang-Ambedkarite body) frequently organise processions on their jayanti (birthday in Marathi and other Indian languages).
Pune City Corporation created a memorial for her in 1983.
On 10 March 1998 a stamp was released by India Post in honour of Phule. 
Savitribai's birthdate, 3 January, is celebrated as Balika Din in the whole of Maharashtra, especially in girls' schools.
In 2015, the University of Pune was renamed as Savitribai Phule Pune University in her honour.
On 3 January 2017, the search engine Google marked the 186th anniversary of the birth of Savitribai Phule with a Google doodle.

In popular culture
Krantijyoti Savitribai Phule, an Indian drama television series based on her life was aired on DD National in 2016.
Savitri Jyoti, a Marathi drama television series based on the life and work of Savitribai Phule and Jyotiba Phule was aired on Sony Marathi in 2019- 2020.
Savitribai Phule, an Indian Kannada-language biopic was made about Phule in 2018. 
In 2021, Pune university created a 12.5 foot, life-size bronze metal statue of Phule, It is expected to inaugurate in 2022.

See also     
 Women in India

References 
Notes

Citations

Further reading

External links 

 
Savitribai Phule at Google Arts & Culture
Savitribai Phule Biography And Real Photo Date:12 February 2023 

1831 births
1897 deaths
19th-century deaths from plague (disease)
19th-century Indian poets
19th-century Indian women writers
Activists from Maharashtra
Adult education leaders
Founders of Indian schools and colleges
Indian feminists
Indian social reformers
Indian women activists
Indian women poets
Jyotirao Phule
Marathi-language poets
People from Palghar district
Poets from Maharashtra
Satyashodhak Samaj
Women writers from Maharashtra
Women's education in India